Erdal Sunar (born 1 May 1982 in Kütahya, Turkey) is a Turkish weightlifter competing in the –85 kg division.

He studied physical education and sports at the Kütahya Dumlupınar University, and graduated in 2005. Erdal Sunar started with weightlifting in 1994, and is coached since then by Hilmi Pekünlü. In 1998, he was admitted to the national team.

He married in 2006 to Müslime, a French policewoman. A member of a Turkish family immigrated to France, she competes in the –63 kg division of women's weightlifting for France.

Achievements
World Weightlifting Championships

European Weightlifting Championships

World University Championships

European Junior Championships

References

External links
 Erdal Sunar at Database Weightlifting
 
 

1982 births
Living people
Turkish male weightlifters
European Weightlifting Championships medalists
Kütahya Dumlupınar University alumni
People from Kütahya
21st-century Turkish people